Baya El Hachemi, is an Algerian–Swiss director, producer and journalist. She is best known as the director of the television serials El Maktoub and El Qada Wa El Qadar. She also was an activist for the independence of Algeria.

Personal life
She is currently settled in Quebec in 2005. Meanwhile, she completed her bachelor's degree in literary studies at the University of Quebec in Montreal. Then she involved in several organizations, such as "Halte la Ressource".

Career
She is often known as the "first and foremost a journalist on the Algerian radio". In 1975, she made the serial Faces of Women which telecasted until 1977. Then as a producer, she made El Maktoub, and El Qada Wa El Qadar in 2003 and El Qilada, and Tahaddi Imraae in 2014. With the guidance of Minister of Culture, Nadia Labidi, Baya created the platform La maison de l'artiste ("The artist's house"). In 2003, she made the television serial Destiny. In the same year, she started her film which was based on National Liberation War and the events occurred between 1932 and independence of Algeria. In 2007, she made the documentary film Mamya Chentouf: Activist of the First Hour based on the life of Mamia Chentouf, the first Parisian woman journalist.

Filmography

References

External links
 

Living people
1966 births
Algerian filmmakers
Swiss filmmakers
Algerian women film directors
Algerian women film producers
Swiss film producers
Swiss women film producers
Algerian film producers
Writers from Algiers
Swiss women journalists
Algerian women journalists
Women radio journalists
Swiss radio journalists
Swiss women film directors
21st-century Algerian people